Judge Drayton mnay refer to:

John Drayton (1766–1822), judge of the United States District Court for the District of South Carolina
William Drayton Sr. (1732–1790), chief justice of the British American Province of East Florida and judge of the United States District Court for the District of South Carolina

See also
Boston Jenkins Drayton (1821–1865), 3rd Chief Justice of Liberia
Nicholas de Drayton (fl. 1376), English ecclesiastic and judge